The 2011 European Rally Championship season was the 59th season of the FIA European Rally Championship, the European continental championship series in rallying. The season consisted of eleven rallies, beginning with Rally 1000 Miglia on 14 April 2011 and concluding with the Rallye International du Valais on 29 October 2011. Only drivers registered for the European championship were allowed to score points at the events, and they had to compete in a minimum of 8 rallies to be classified in the final championship standings. 28 drivers were registered for the season, the majority (15) were from Italy, four were from Poland, three from Bulgaria, two each from Slovenia and France and one each from Czech Republic and Switzerland.

As in the previous year, Italian driver Luca Rossetti won the European championship, driving an Abarth Grande Punto S2000 car. He won the European championship category in 5 rallies. Second place in the final standings was claimed by Luca Betti (Italy), who won 2 events. Polish driver Michał Sołowow was the ERC winner in 3 events, but did not compete in enough rallies to be classified in the final standings.

Calendar
The original calendar for the 2011 season featured 12 rallies, the 11 rallies from the previous season plus Rally Bulgaria which returned after one year with the WRC. However, the first event, the ELPA Rally in Greece, was cancelled, leaving 11 rallies, 9 of them on tarmac. Two events were shared with the Intercontinental Rally Challenge: Ypres and Zlín.

Results and standings

Results and statistics

Note: the results and statistics only consider drivers starting in the ERC.

Drivers' championship
For the final classification in a rally, the winner got 25 points, the runner-up 18 and the third placed driver 15. Drivers ranked 4 to 10 got 12–10–8–6–4–2–1 point(s). Additionally, the top five of every leg got 7–5–3–2–1 point(s). The season was divided into two parts (first 5 and last 6 rallies). From each part, only the 4 best results for each driver counted towards the championship. To qualify for the final standings, a driver had to participate in at least 5 events and in at least 1 in each part of the season.

2WD drivers' championship
Any driver participating in a 2WD car automatically also scored points for the 2WD championship.

External links
 Official website

References

European Rally Championship
Rally Championship
2011